The 1991 Gent–Wevelgem was the 53rd edition of the Gent–Wevelgem cycle race and was held on 10 April 1991. The race started in Ghent and finished in Wevelgem. The race was won by Djamolidine Abdoujaparov of the Carrera team.

General classification

References

Gent–Wevelgem
April 1991 sports events in Europe
1991 in road cycling
1991 in Belgian sport